Annie Alexander may refer to:

Annie Lowrie Alexander (1864–1929), American physician and educator
Annie Montague Alexander (1867–1950), American philanthropist and paleontological collector

See also
Ann Alexander (disambiguation)